Alfred John Wheeler (6 April 1922 – January 2013) was an English footballer who played as a right winger in the Football League.

References

External links
 

1922 births
2013 deaths
English footballers
People from Fareham
Portsmouth F.C. players
Swindon Town F.C. players
Blackburn Rovers F.C. players
Weymouth F.C. players
English Football League players
Association football wingers